Withycombe is a surname, and may refer to:

 Elizabeth Withycombe (born 1902), English compiler of reference books
 James Withycombe (1843-1919), British-born American politician
 Mike Withycombe (born 1964), former professional American and Canadian football offensive lineman

Surnames